Xanthophyllum resupinatum is a tree in the family Polygalaceae. The specific epithet  is from the Latin meaning "upside-down appearance", referring to the leaves.

Description
The smooth bark is grey or brown. The flowers are white, drying dark brownish.

Distribution and habitat
Xanthophyllum resupinatum is endemic to Borneo. Its habitat is mixed dipterocarp forest from sea-level to  altitude.

References

resupinatum
Endemic flora of Borneo
Trees of Borneo
Plants described in 1973